Qaleh Sorkh or Qaleh-ye Sorkh or Qaleh-e Sorkh or Qaleh Surkh may refer to:
 Qaleh-ye Sorkh, Falavarjan, Isfahan Province
 Qaleh Sorkh, Fereydunshahr, Isfahan Province
 Qaleh Sorkh, Kermanshah
 Qaleh Sorkh, Bakharz, Razavi Khorasan Province
 Qaleh-ye Sorkh, Torbat-e Jam, Torbat-e Jam County, Razavi Khorasan Province
 Qaleh-ye Sorkh, Nasrabad, Torbat-e Jam County, Razavi Khorasan Province
 Qaleh Sorkh, South Khorasan